The Baltic School District is a public school district in Minnehaha County, based in Baltic, South Dakota.

Schools
The Baltic School District has one elementary school, one middle school, and one high school.

Elementary schools
Baltic Elementary School

Middle schools
Baltic Middle School

High schools
Baltic High School

References

External links

School districts in South Dakota